James Russell Lowell Elementary School was located at 4501 Crittenden Drive in the Highland Park neighborhood of Louisville, Kentucky. Construction began in 1916 on the original portion of the building that was known as Highland Park School and had the only remaining bell tower on a Public School in Louisville, Kentucky. Subsequent construction began in 1931 and the school became known as Lowell. The school was later demolished in 1993.

The school was listed on the National Register of Historic Places listings in Jefferson County, Kentucky on September 6, 1983.

References
 Historic American Buildings Survey (Library of Congress)

External links
 Design Drawings, Photographs and Data for Lowell

Credits
Library of Congress, Prints & Photographs Division, KY,56-LOUVI,72-3

Defunct schools in Louisville, Kentucky
National Register of Historic Places in Louisville, Kentucky
Demolished buildings and structures in Louisville, Kentucky
School buildings completed in 1916
Buildings and structures demolished in 1993
1916 establishments in Kentucky
1993 disestablishments in Kentucky
Art Deco architecture in Kentucky
Public elementary schools in Kentucky
School buildings on the National Register of Historic Places in Kentucky
Demolished but still listed on the National Register of Historic Places